Puliyannoor is a village in Kottayam district in the state of Kerala, India. It is located on the state highway leading to Ettumanoor.

Demographics
 India census, Puliyannoor had a population of 15529 with 7544 males and 7985 females.

Sri Mahadeva temple

Puliyannoor Mahadeva Temple is a temple dedicated to Lord Shiva, located in the Mutholy Panchayat. The temple is well known as 'Cheruthil Valuthu' i.e. 'Big among small'. The temple managed by  Namboothiri families known as ' Puliyannoor Oorayma Temple Devaswam' (Endanthuruthi illom , Thuruthipalli illom, Elambilakkodu illom). It is situated close to the Kadappattoor temple which sees a flock of pilgrims during the Sabarimala season.

References

Villages in Kottayam district